Vandeweghe or Vande Weghe is a surname. Notable people with the surname include:

Al Vande Weghe (1916–2002), American swimmer
Charles Vandeweghe (born 1982), Belgian field hockey player
CoCo Vandeweghe (born 1991), American tennis player
Ernest Vandeweghe (disambiguation)
Ernie Vandeweghe (1928–2014), American basketball player and physician
Kiki VanDeWeghe (born 1958), American basketball executive, former player and coach
Tauna Vandeweghe (born 1960), American swimmer